Charles Blake (13 August 1746 – 22 April 1810) was a British army surgeon with the 34th Foot Regiment as part of the force sent to fight the Americans. 

Blake arrived in the province of Quebec in the spring of 1776 and was involved in a number of professional roles until after the end of the American Revolutionary War. He remained in Canada when the regiment returned home.

References 

 

1746 births
1810 deaths
British surgeons
Canadian surgeons
British Army personnel of the American Revolutionary War
18th-century English medical doctors
People from Somerset
British Army regimental surgeons